The Journal of Invertebrate Pathology is a peer-reviewed scientific journal publishing research on the induction and pathogenesis of diseases of invertebrates, owned by Academic Press (part of Elsevier). The journal publishes the results of physiological, morphological, genetic, immunological, and ecological studies as related to the etiologic agents of diseases of invertebrates, including the suppression of diseases in beneficial species, and the use of diseases in controlling undesirable species.

It was founded by American microbiologist Edward Arthur Steinhaus in 1959 as the Journal of Insect Pathology, renamed in 1965, and in 1968 adopted as the official journal of the Society for Invertebrate Pathology shortly after it was also founded by Steinhaus.

See also 
 Arbovirus
 List of Elsevier periodicals
 List of entomology journals
 List of insect-borne diseases

References 

Entomology journals and magazines
Elsevier academic journals
Triannual journals
Publications established in 1959
Society for Invertebrate Pathology